Michael William Wheeler (born 5 November 1960) is a British philosopher and Professor of Philosophy at the University of Stirling.
He is known for his Heideggerian approach to  contemporary cognitive science research.

Books
 Distributed Cognition in Medieval and Renaissance Culture
 Distributed Cognition in Enlightenment and Romantic Culture
 Heidegger and Cognitive Science
 Reconstructing the Cognitive World: The Next Step

References

External links

21st-century British philosophers
Philosophy academics
Living people
1960 births
Philosophers of mind
Heidegger scholars
Continental philosophers
Alumni of the University of Sussex
Academics of the University of Stirling
British cognitive scientists